Graphiocephala is a genus of moths in the family Gracillariidae.

Species
Graphiocephala barbitias (Meyrick, 1909)
Graphiocephala polysticha Vári, 1961
Graphiocephala strigifera Vári, 1961

External links
Global Taxonomic Database of Gracillariidae (Lepidoptera) 

Gracillariinae
Gracillarioidea genera